The office of the Moderator of the General Assembly is the highest elected position in the Presbyterian Church (USA).  The Moderator is responsible for presiding over the meeting of the General Assembly, which was held annually until 2004, and on alternate years since.  After the meeting, which lasts for about a week, the Moderator serves as an ambassador of the denomination throughout the remainder of the term.  After completing the term, most former Moderators take on the role of a church statesman or stateswoman.

The chart below shows the Moderators and Vice Moderators, and the place of meetings, since the United Presbyterian Church in the United States of America and the Presbyterian Church in the United States merged to form the present day Presbyterian Church (USA).

Moderators and Vice Moderators of Presbyterian Church (USA) General Assemblies

See also
List of Moderators of the General Assembly of the Presbyterian Church in the United States of America

References

Presbyterian Church (USA)
American Christian clergy
Moderators